Usmanwala railway station is  located in  town of Usman Wala, Kasur District, Pakistan.

See also
 List of railway stations in Pakistan
 Pakistan Railways

References

External links

Railway stations in Kasur District
Railway stations on Lodhran–Raiwind Line